Pavel Stratil (born 17 April 1945) is a Czechoslovak footballer. He competed in the men's tournament at the 1968 Summer Olympics. On a club level, Stratil played for Teplice and Sparta Prague. He won two caps for Czechoslovakia.

References

External links
 

1945 births
Living people
Czech footballers
Czechoslovak footballers
Czechoslovakia international footballers
Olympic footballers of Czechoslovakia
Footballers at the 1968 Summer Olympics
Sportspeople from Olomouc
Association football forwards
FK Teplice players
AC Sparta Prague players